Karkan-e Bala (also Romanized as Karkān-e Bālā and Karakān-e Bāla; also known as Garakān, Garakān-e ‘Olyā, and Karkān-e ‘Olyā) is a village in Saruq Rural District, Saruq District, Farahan County, Markazi Province, Iran. At the 2006 census, its population was 76, in 26 families.

References 

Populated places in Farahan County